Emmanuel Jambo is a South Sudanese photographer based in Nairobi, Kenya. He is among the most sought after photographers in East and Central Africa and is popularly known for taking the official Kenyan president Uhuru Kenyatta's official portrait. In 2012, Emmanuel was recognized by Forbes Magazine as one of the most influential photographers in Africa, and later on named the official photographer for Kenya's President Uhuru Kenyatta.

References

External links

 Jambo on facebook
 

People from Juba
People from Nakuru County
1987 births
Living people
Date of birth missing (living people)